Midnight is a 1934 American drama film, the first directed by Chester Erskine, and starring Sidney Fox, O.P. Heggie, Henry Hull and Margaret Wycherly. It was based on a Theatre Guild play with the same name by Paul and Claire Sifton. The film was produced for Universal and was shot on a modest budget of $50,000 at Thomas Edison Studios, which producer/director Chester Erskine had re-opened specifically for the shoot.

Humphrey Bogart had a supporting though key role. The film was re-released as Call It Murder by Screen Guild Productions (Guaranteed Pictures) in 1949 after Bogart became a star; he was given top billing, although he is present in few scenes and was credited eighth in the original release.

Plot
The movie begins at the murder trial of Ethel Saxon, a woman who shot her lover in a crime of passion. During the trial, Edward Weldon, the jury foreman, asks the defendant a question, which ultimately leads to a guilty verdict and a death sentence for her.

The rest of film takes place on the evening of the execution, mostly in the Weldon home. Edward is dealing with the consequences of his role as foreman. Friends have come to the house to support the family. An unscrupulous journalist who has bribed Weldon's son in law is also in attendance. Weldon's daughter Stella is upset by the departure of her gangster boyfriend, Gar Boni, whom she met during the trial. The evening culminates at midnight in a sequence in which three scenes are cross cut together: the switch is pulled at the death house, a gun is fired apparently in Boni's parked car, and a press photograph is taken of Edward Weldon's reaction. Moments later, Stella returns home, under the impression that she has shot Gar Boni. Weldon, torn between love for his daughter and his past pronouncements about the rule of law, contacts the district attorney to come to the house.

Cast
Sidney Fox ...  Stella Weldon
O.P. Heggie ...  Edward Weldon
Henry Hull ...  Nolan
Margaret Wycherly ...  Mrs. Weldon
Lynne Overman ...  Joe Biggers (as Lynn Overman)
Katherine Wilson ...  Ada Biggers
Richard Whorf ...  Arthur Weldon
Humphrey Bogart ...  Gar Boni
Granville Bates ...  Henry McGrath
Cora Witherspoon ...  Elizabeth McGrath
Moffat Johnston ...  Dist. Atty. Plunkett
Henry O'Neill ...  Ingersoll (as Henry O'Neil)

References

External links
 
 

1934 films
American black-and-white films
1934 crime drama films
Film noir
1934 romantic drama films
Films directed by Chester Erskine
American crime drama films
American romantic drama films
1930s English-language films
1930s American films